Bekir Özlü (born Betkili Shukvani, on 30 August 1988 in Mestia, Samegrelo-Zemo Svaneti, Georgia) is an Olympian Georgian-born Turkish judoka competing in the 60 kg division. Bekir Ozlu née Betkil Shukvani was born in Georgia but changed to Turkey in 2015. For Georgia he won European medals U17 and U20 and silver at the Senior European in 2011 in Istanbul. He won the European team title with Georgia in 2007. He won World Cups since 2011 and the Grand Slam of Rio in 2012. Ozlu won gold at the European Open in Minsk in 2017. He captured a bronze medal at the Grand Prix in Zagreb in 2017. Ozlu took gold at the Grand Prix The Hague in 2017.

In Georgia
In 2011, he took the silver medal at the European Judo Championships held in Istanbul, Turkey.

He represented his country at the 2012 Summer Olympics. He was defeated in the second round.

In Turkey
In 2015, he switched allegiance to Turkey, and adopted the Turkish given name and surname.

Özlü represented Turkey at the 2015 Grand Prix in Düsseldorf, Germany, and took the bronze medal. He captured the gold medal at the 2015 European Judo Open in Cluj-Napoca, Romania.  He also competed at the 2016 Summer Olympics.  In 2017, he won gold at the European Open in Minsk.

Competitive record

(as of 19 July 2018)

References

External links

 
 

1988 births
People from Samegrelo-Zemo Svaneti
Male judoka from Georgia (country)
Olympic judoka of Georgia (country)
Judoka at the 2012 Summer Olympics
Judoka at the 2016 Summer Olympics
Olympic judoka of Turkey
Georgian emigrants to Turkey
Naturalized citizens of Turkey
Turkish male judoka
Kocaeli Büyükşehir Belediyesi Kağıt Spor athletes
Living people
Competitors at the 2018 Mediterranean Games
Mediterranean Games bronze medalists for Turkey
Mediterranean Games medalists in judo
Judoka at the 2019 European Games
European Games competitors for Turkey